Giovanni Paolo Oderico (1613–1657) was an Italian painter of the Baroque period, mainly active in Genoa. He was born in Genoa. One of many sons to a lesser nobleman, Tomasso Oderico, he showed affinity to painting, and was apprenticed to the Genoese painter Domenico Fiasella.

Sources

1613 births
1657 deaths
17th-century Italian painters
Italian male painters
Painters from Genoa
Italian Baroque painters